Allen Edward Hatcher (born October 23, 1944) is an American topologist.

Biography
Hatcher was born in Indianapolis, Indiana. After obtaining his B.S from Oberlin College in 1966, he went for his graduate studies to Stanford University, where he received his Ph.D. in 1971. His thesis, A K2 Obstruction for Pseudo-Isotopies, was written under the supervision of Hans Samelson. Afterwards, Hatcher went to Princeton University, where he was an NSF postdoc for a year, then a lecturer for another year, and then Assistant Professor from 1973 to 1979. He was also a member of the Institute for Advanced Study in 1975–76 and 1979–80. Hatcher went on to become a professor at the University of California, Los Angeles in 1977. From 1983 he has been a professor at Cornell University; he is now a professor emeritus.

In 1978 Hatcher was an invited speaker at the International Congresses of Mathematicians in Helsinki.

Mathematical contributions
He has worked in geometric topology, both in high dimensions, relating pseudoisotopy to algebraic K-theory, and in low dimensions: surfaces and 3-manifolds, such as proving the Smale conjecture for the 3-sphere.

3-manifolds
Perhaps among his most recognized results in 3-manifolds concern the classification of incompressible surfaces in certain 3-manifolds and their boundary slopes. William Floyd and Hatcher classified all the incompressible surfaces in punctured-torus bundles over the circle. William Thurston and Hatcher classified the incompressible surfaces in 2-bridge knot complements. As corollaries, this gave more examples of non-Haken, non-Seifert fibered, irreducible 3-manifolds and extended the techniques and line of investigation started in Thurston's Princeton lecture notes. Hatcher also showed that irreducible, boundary-irreducible 3-manifolds with toral boundary have at most "half" of all possible boundary slopes resulting from essential surfaces. In the case of one torus boundary, one can conclude that the number of slopes given by essential surfaces is finite.

Hatcher has made contributions to the so-called theory of essential laminations in 3-manifolds. He invented the notion of "end-incompressibility" and several of his students, such as Mark Brittenham, Charles Delman, and Rachel Roberts, have made important contributions to the theory.

Surfaces
Hatcher and Thurston exhibited an algorithm to produce a presentation of the mapping class group of a closed, orientable surface. Their work relied on the notion of a cut system and moves that relate any two systems.

Selected publications

Papers
 Allen Hatcher and William Thurston, A presentation for the mapping class group of a closed orientable surface, Topology 19 (1980), no. 3, 221–237.
 Allen Hatcher, On the boundary curves of incompressible surfaces, Pacific Journal of Mathematics 99 (1982), no. 2, 373–377.
 William Floyd and Allen Hatcher, Incompressible surfaces in punctured-torus bundles, Topology and its Applications 13 (1982), no. 3, 263–282.
 Allen Hatcher and William Thurston, Incompressible surfaces in 2-bridge knot complements, Inventiones Mathematicae 79 (1985), no. 2, 225–246.
 Allen Hatcher, A proof of the Smale conjecture, Annals of Mathematics (2) 117 (1983), no. 3, 553–607.

Books

External links

References

1944 births
Living people
People from Indianapolis
Mathematicians from Indiana
Oberlin College alumni
Stanford University alumni
20th-century American mathematicians
21st-century American mathematicians
Topologists
Princeton University faculty
Institute for Advanced Study visiting scholars
University of California, Los Angeles faculty
Cornell University faculty